Miankuh Rural District may refer to various places in Iran:
 Miankuh Rural District (Ardal County), Chaharmahal and Bakhtiari province
 Miankuh Rural District (Dargaz County), Razavi Khorasan province
 Miankuh Rural District (Mehriz County), Yazd province

See also
 Miankuh-e Moguyi Rural District, Chaharmahal and Bakhtiari province